Governor of Tomsk Oblast is the highest official and the head of the executive power of Tomsk Oblast in Russia.

Term of office - five years

History

List of governors

References

Links
 Website of Governor of TO

Politics of Tomsk Oblast
Tomsk